WVPE (88.1 FM) is the National Public Radio member station for the Michiana region of northern Indiana and southwest Michigan. Licensed to Elkhart, Indiana and owned by Elkhart Community Schools, it features programming from NPR, American Public Media and Public Radio International.

History

The station went on the air in 1972 as a student operated station.

In 1982, the station added its first full-time staff person and started a transition away from a student lab to serve the public as a public radio service.  In 1983, the station started playing jazz, blues, folk and other music

In 1984, it added programming from the public radio satellite such as A Prairie Home Companion and The Thistle & Shamrock when it joined American Public Radio (now Public Radio International).

In 1987, the station added its first public radio news programming and qualified for federal funding from the Corporation for Public Broadcasting in 1990.

Throughout the 1980s, WVPE grew in its services and audience with a mix of jazz, blues and folk music.

In 1991, the station joined National Public Radio bringing NPR News programming back to the region after a 16-month absence.

In 1995, the station moved to an all-NPR News format with the addition of The Diane Rehm Show and Talk of the Nation.

In 2000, WVPE was recognized with awards from Indiana Associated Press and the Society of Professional Journalists followed by six awards in 2002 for news coverage (including Best Newscast from IAP, and Spectrum Award from IBA for Best News Story).

In 2003, the station received 11 awards for news coverage including an Edward R. Murrow Award for Excellence in Sports Reporting.

In 2007 the station's Michiana Chronicles commentary series won a regional Murrow award for writing.  The weekly series presents stories and essays by local writers from Michiana, the region of north-central Indiana and southern Michigan roughly centered on South Bend.

External links

VPE
NPR member stations
Radio stations established in 1972